Harry Boyes is the name of:

Harry Boyes (cricketer), South African cricketer
Harry Boyes (footballer), English footballer
Harry Boyes (rugby union), South African rugby union player